The foreign relations of Afghanistan are in a transitional phase since the 2021 fall of Kabul to the Taliban and the collapse of the internationally-recognized Islamic Republic of Afghanistan. No country has recognised the new regime, the Islamic Emirate of Afghanistan. Although some countries have engaged in informal diplomatic contact with the Islamic Emirate, formal relations remain limited to representatives of the Islamic Republic.

History 
Before the Soviet invasion, Afghanistan pursued a policy of neutrality and non-alignment in its foreign relations, being one of the few independent nations to stay neutral in both World War I and World War II. In international forums, Afghanistan generally followed the voting patterns of Asian and African non-aligned countries. During the 1950s and 1960s, Afghanistan was able to use the Soviet and American need for allies during the Cold War as a way to receive economic assistance from both countries. However, given that unlike the Soviet Union, the United States refused to give extensive military aid to the country, the government of Daoud Khan developed warmer ties with the USSR while officially remaining non-aligned. Following the coup of April 1978, the government under Nur Muhammad Taraki developed significantly closer ties with the Soviet Union and its communist satellites.

After the December 1979 Soviet invasion, Afghanistan's foreign policy mirrored that of the Soviet Union. Afghan foreign policymakers attempted, with little success, to increase their regime's low standing in the noncommunist world. With the signing of the Geneva Accords, President Najibullah unsuccessfully sought to end the Democratic Republic of Afghanistan's isolation within the Islamic world and in the Non-Aligned Movement.

Most Western countries, including the United States, maintained small diplomatic missions in the capital city of Kabul during the Soviet occupation. Many countries subsequently closed their missions due to instability and heavy fighting in Kabul after the Soviet withdrawal in 1989.

Many countries initially welcomed the introduction of the Taliban regime, who they saw as a stabilising, law-enforcing alternative to the warlords who had ruled the country since the fall of Najibullah's government in 1992. The Taliban soon alienated itself as knowledge of the harsh Sharia law being enforced in Taliban-controlled territories spread around the world. The brutality towards women who attempted to work, learn, or leave the house without a male escort caused outside aid to the war-torn country to be limited.

Islamic Republic of Afghanistan 
Following the October 2001 American invasion and the Bonn Agreement the new government under the leadership of Hamid Karzai started to re-establish diplomatic relationships with many countries who had held close diplomatic relations before the communist coup d'état and the subsequent civil war.

The Afghan government was focused on securing continued assistance for rebuilding the economy, infrastructure, and military of the country. It has continued to maintain close ties with North America, the European Union, South Korea, Japan, Australia, India, Pakistan, China, Russia and the Greater Middle East (most specifically Turkey), as well as African nations. It also sought to establish relations with more South American or Latin American nations.

Before the fall of Kabul in 2021, the foreign relations of Afghanistan were handled by the nation's Ministry of Foreign Affairs, which was headed by Mohammad Hanif Atmar. He answered to, and received guidance from, the President of Afghanistan.

Islamic Emirate of Afghanistan 

The Taliban gradually gained control of the country in the summer of 2021 and proclaimed the Islamic Emirate of Afghanistan on August 15, 2021. The takeover culminated with the fall of Kabul. The Taliban has had some limited contact with foreign governments and will need to develop further relations with the international community as its new de facto government goes forward.

On 20 September 2021, the new government designated Mohammad Suhail Shaheen as a replacement for Ghulam M Isaczai, Permanent Representative of Afghanistan to the United Nations who continues to represent the country at the UN. The UNGA's nine-member credentials committee will decide on this but no date has been set.

Since the Taliban took over the Afghan government, countries including China, Russia, and the United States have contacted Taliban representatives, but have expressed doubts about its commitment to counterterrorism. Border clashes between the Taliban forces with Pakistan, Iran and Turkmenistan have also caused friction with Afghanistan's neighbours.

Bilateral relations (Islamic Republic of Afghanistan)

Countries with limited recognition

Europe

Oceania

United Nations
During the Soviet occupation, the United Nations was highly critical of the U.S.S.R.'s interference in the internal affairs of Afghanistan and was instrumental in obtaining a negotiated Soviet withdrawal under the terms of the Geneva Accords.

In the aftermath of the Accords and subsequent Soviet withdrawal, the United Nations has assisted in the repatriation of refugees and has provided humanitarian aid such as health care, educational programs, and food and has supported mine-clearing operations. The UNDP and associated agencies have undertaken a limited number of development projects. However, the UN reduced its role in Afghanistan in 1992 in the wake of fierce factional strife in and around Kabul. The UN Secretary General has designated a personal representative to head the Office for the Coordination of Humanitarian Assistance to Afghanistan (UNOCHA) and the Special Mission to Afghanistan (UNSMA), both based in Islamabad, Pakistan. Throughout the late 1990s, 2000, and 2001, the UN unsuccessfully strived to promote a peaceful settlement between the Afghan factions as well as provide humanitarian aid, this despite increasing Taliban restrictions upon UN personnel and agencies.

See also
 List of diplomatic missions in Afghanistan
 List of diplomatic missions of Afghanistan
 Visa requirements for Afghan citizens

References

Further reading
Adamec, Ludwig W. Afghanistan, 1900–1923: a diplomatic history (U of California Press, 1967).
Adamec, Ludwig W. Afghanistan's foreign affairs to the mid-twentieth century: relations with the USSR, Germany, and Britain (University of Arizona Press, 1974).
Kakar, M. Hassan. Political & Diplomatic History of Afghanistan, 1863–1901 (2006), 259pp.

External links
Ministry of Foreign Affairs of Afghanistan (official website)
Embassy of Afghanistan – Washington, DC
Embassy of the United States in Kabul
Embassy of Afghanistan – Ottawa, Canada
Embassies and consulates in Afghanistan and Afghani missions abroad